Udhowala is a village in the Punjab of Pakistan. It is located at 30°59'50N 70°54'0E with an altitude of 136 metres (449 feet).

References

Villages in Punjab, Pakistan